Malaysia has participated from the 1991 Summer Universiade.

Summer Universiade

Medals by Games

Medals by sport

Medals by individual

See also
Malaysia at the Olympics
Malaysia at the Youth Olympics
Malaysia at the Paralympics
Malaysia at the Asian Games
Malaysia at the Commonwealth Games

References

External links
 FISU History at the FISU

 
Nations at the Universiade
Student sport in Malaysia